Okwy Diamondstar is an Australian retired footballer who played as a defender and last played for Ashfield SC.

Career

Indonesia
Recommended to Persis Solo prior to the 2007–08 Liga Indonesia Premier Division, Diamondstar eventually put pen to paper on the deal.

India
Called to test for Mohun Bagan partway through August 2010, he was listed prior to the Mariners matchup with Chirag United, debuting as they fell 1–0.

Claiming that Mohun Bagan owed him a part of his salary and medical expenses, he lodged a complaint to the AIFF and FIFA but it was dismissed by a city court, alleviating Mohun's pressure to pay.

References

External links 
 SportsTG Profile

Australian people of Nigerian descent
Living people
Expatriate footballers in India
Expatriate footballers in Indonesia
Persis Solo players
Mohun Bagan AC players
Stirling Macedonia FC players
Australian soccer players
Australian expatriate soccer players
I-League players
Association football defenders
Floreat Athena FC players
Western Knights SC players
1986 births